Michael McIntyre (born 1976) is an English comedian

Michael McIntyre may also refer to:

Michael E. McIntyre, professor of atmospheric dynamics
Michael McIntyre (sailor) (born 1956), British sailor and Olympic champion
Michael McIntyre (cricketer) (1839–1888), English cricketer
Mike McIntyre (born 1956), American politician